A centipede is an arthropod belonging to the class Chilopoda.

Centipede may also refer to:

 Centipede (album), by Rebbie Jackson
 Centipede (band), U.K. band led by Keith Tippett
 Centipede (film), a 2018 Iranian film
 "Centipede" (Rebbie Jackson song), 1984
 "Centipede" (Knife Party song), 2012
 Centipede (video game), arcade game by Atari
 Centipede (1998 video game), remake of the arcade game
 Centipede game, in game theory
 Centipede mathematics
 Centipede grass, Eremochloa ophiuroides, a warm season lawn grass
 Centipede plant, Homalocladium platycladum, also called Tapeworm Plant or Ribbon Bush
 Centipede Nunatak
 Centipede Press, an American publisher
Locomotive Baldwin DR-12-8-1500/2, nicknamed Centipede

See also
 Sea centipede, a common name given to various sea creatures
 Millipede (disambiguation)